Lawrence Wayne Conjar (born October 28, 1945) is a former American football running back who played four seasons in the National Football League with the Cleveland Browns, Philadelphia Eagles and Baltimore Colts. He was drafted by the Cleveland Browns in the second round of the 1967 NFL Draft. He played college football at the University of Notre Dame and attended Bishop McDevitt High School in Harrisburg, Pennsylvania.

References

External links
Just Sports Stats
College stats

Living people
1945 births
Players of American football from Harrisburg, Pennsylvania
American football running backs
Notre Dame Fighting Irish football players
Cleveland Browns players
Philadelphia Eagles players
Baltimore Colts players